Locos por la música is a 1980 Argentine film directed by Enrique Dawi. It was released in 1980.

Plot
A tropical music band led by Carlos Bala trying to get people's attention from record

Cast
 Carlos Balá
 Graciela Alfano
 Raúl Rossi
 Carlos Calvo
 Santiago Bal
 Iris Láinez
 María Fernanda
 Vicente La Russa
 Tito Mendoza
 Ricardo Morán
 Boney M.
 Danny Cabuche
 Silvana Di Lorenzo
 Jairo
 Los Iracundos
 Matías
 Laurent Voulzy
 Palito Ortega
 Inés García Escariz
 Analía García Escariz
 Bárbara Bourse
 Fernando Sustaita
 Enzo Bai
 Néstor Mazzei
 Fernando Madanes
Source:

References

External links
 

1980 films
Argentine musical comedy films
1980s Spanish-language films
Films directed by Enrique Dawi
1980s Argentine films